Break-in is a 1927 German crime film directed by Franz Osten and starring Erika Glässner, Camilla von Hollay and Ralph Arthur Roberts.

The film's sets were designed by the art director Max Heilbronner.

Cast
Erika Glässner as Jutta Percha, Film diva
Camilla von Hollay as Paula
Ralph Arthur Roberts as Max Plettke
Paul Morgan as Polenwilli, a heavy boy
Kurt Gerron as Willi, ein noch schwererer Junge
Maria Forescu as Wirtin
Julius Falkenstein as Count Parisello
Albert Paulig as Dr. Schmidt, Detective Commissioner
Nina Rinewa as Elfriede
Leni Sponholz
Gyula Szőreghy

References

External links

1927 crime films
Films of the Weimar Republic
German silent feature films
German crime films
Films directed by Franz Osten
German black-and-white films
1920s German films
1920s German-language films